This is a list of episodes of The Ray Bradbury Theater.  The series broadcast 65 episodes over 6 seasons in the 1980s and early 1990s.

Series overview

Episodes

Season 1 (1985–86)

Season 2 (1988)

Season 3 (1989)

Season 4 (1990)

Season 5 (1992)

Season 6 (1992)

External links 

The Ray Bradbury Theater Episode Guide

Ray Bradbury Theater, The
Ray Bradbury Theater, The